Román Benedicto Colón (born August 13, 1979) is a Dominican former professional baseball pitcher. Colón bats and throws right-handed. He played in Major League Baseball (MLB) for the Atlanta Braves, Detroit Tigers, and Kansas City Royals.

Professional career

Atlanta Braves

In , he ranked first in the Gulf Coast League in runs allowed (47) and earned runs (30), 5th in innings pitched (63), 4th in hits allowed (68), 2nd in games started (12). In , he ranked 3rd in the Appalachian League in runs (59) and games started (13), 4th in earned runs (47) and first in hits allowed (92) and losses (7).

In , he was named by the organization as Jamestown's Pitcher of the Year. He led the team in wins and strikeouts and tied for the team lead in innings pitched. He had the 9th best walks per 9 innings ratio in Macon Braves history (1.83) and struck out a season high 7 batters three times. He struck out 6 in 6 innings on May 18 at Asheville for his first win of the season.

In the two seasons after his arm trouble, he walked just 64 batters in 291 innings with 185 strikeouts. Colón pitched a complete game on June 2 versus Frederick (9 IP, 7 H, 1 R, 1 ER, 6 K). He also struck out a season-high eight batters on May 6 vs. Winston-Salem ( IP, 6 H, 1 R, 0 ER, 1 BB, 8 K).

In , he was named Greenville Braves Pitcher of the Month in April (2-0, 2.86 ERA in 4 G). He finished 1st on the club and 3rd in the Double-A Southern League in wins, going 11–3. He earned a win in his first Double-A start in a 3–1 victory verse Chattanooga on April 9 (5 IP, 3 H, 1 R, 3 BB, 4 K). He won his first 3 decisions before losing back to back starts on May 12 and May 17, giving up 8 runs on 16 hits over 12 innings. He went 6–3 (3.66) in 12 starts ( IP, 68 H, 22 BB, 38 K) and was 5–0 (2.78) with 2 saves in 27 relief appearances ( IP, 36 H, 11 BB, 20 K). However, he closed the season by winning his final 7 decisions (did not lose after May 29) and did not allow a run over his final 13 appearances of the season from August 1 through September 1. He earned his first professional save by firing a perfect inning in a 5–3 win at Jacksonville on July 23.

At Triple-A Richmond, he went 4–1 with a 3.65 ERA in 51 appearances and was Richmond Pitcher of the Month for July, going 2–0 with a 1.33 ERA (12G,  IP, 3 ER, BB, 17 K). He walked just two batters after July 1 with Richmond (19 G, 31.1 IP) and did not allow a run over his last six appearances, from August 4–August 17 ( IP, 2 H, BB, 11 K). He was recalled by Atlanta on August 18 and made his major league debut August 21 at Los Angeles, pitching the eighth inning. He did not allow a hit and fanned two. He earned first ML win on August 30 versus San Francisco with a scoreless ninth inning. He suffered his first MLB loss on September 9 against Philadelphia. He had filled in admirably in an injury depleted Atlanta Braves rotation in 2005, holding the Chicago Cubs to one run in seven innings on July 5.

Detroit Tigers
The Detroit Tigers acquired Colón from the Braves (along with Zach Miner) for Kyle Farnsworth at the July 31, trade deadline. He spent most of his Tigers tenure in the bullpen before making two spot starts in September, and was shelved after that with stiffness in his throwing elbow. In , he appeared in 20 games for the Tigers.

Colón started the  season on the DL. During a rehab assignment in Triple-A Toledo, he was involved in an altercation with fellow pitcher Jordan Tata. During the course of the fight, Colón attempted to punch Tata and instead landed a punch to the face of Jason Karnuth, the Mud Hens closer who was trying to intercede and break up the fight. The resulting injury caused Karnuth to be admitted to the hospital and undergo plastic surgery to his face. According to his wife, who filed an assault report against Colón on her husband's behalf, Karnuth required a titanium plate to be screwed into his head. Karnuth missed most of the 2007 season as a result of the injuries. The Tigers suspended Colón for 7 days after the incident. On January 15, 2008, Colón pleaded no contest to an assault charge and was sentenced to 200 hours of community service.

Kansas City Royals
Colón was traded to the Kansas City Royals on July 13, for a player to be named later (minor league pitcher Daniel Christensen). He became a free agent after the 2008 season, but was re-signed by the Royals and invited to their 2009 spring training. He pitched in 48 Major League games with the Royals in 2009 and 2010, finishing 2–3 with a 4.83 ERA.

Kia Tigers

Colón signed with Kia Tigers of South Korea on May 5, 2010. He made 21 starts for the Tigers, finishing 8–7 with a 3.91 ERA.

Los Angeles Dodgers
On January 12, 2011, he signed a minor league contract with the Los Angeles Dodgers, which included an invitation to spring training. He was assigned to the AAA Albuquerque Isotopes. He appeared in 26 games with a 2–1 record and 5.02 ERA for the Isotopes.

Return to Kansas City
Colón signed a minor league contract with the Kansas City Royals on January 25, 2012, and received an invitation to spring training. He was promoted to the Royals on June 14, 2012. On October 6, 2012, Colon elected free agency.

Pittsburgh Pirates
Colón signed a Minor League contract with the Pittsburgh Pirates in February 2013.

Atlanta Braves
Colón was traded to the Atlanta Braves in April 2013.

He was released after 6 games.

Colorado Rockies
He signed with the Rockies in May.

Third Stint with Royals
On January 10, 2015, Colon signed a minor league deal with the Kansas City Royals.

Personal life
He resides in the Dominican Republic.

References

External links

1979 births
Albuquerque Isotopes players
Atlanta Braves players
Brother Elephants players
Colorado Springs Sky Sox players
Danville Braves players
Detroit Tigers players
Dominican Republic expatriate baseball players in South Korea
Dominican Republic expatriate baseball players in Taiwan
Dominican Republic expatriate baseball players in the United States
Erie SeaWolves players
Gigantes del Cibao players
Greenville Braves players
Gulf Coast Braves players
Gwinnett Braves players
Indianapolis Indians players
Jamestown Jammers players
Kansas City Royals players
KBO League pitchers
Kia Tigers players
Living people
Macon Braves players
Major League Baseball pitchers
Major League Baseball players from the Dominican Republic
Mississippi Braves players
Myrtle Beach Pelicans players
Northwest Arkansas Naturals players
Omaha Royals players
Omaha Storm Chasers players
Richmond Braves players
Toledo Mud Hens players